This is a list of compositions by Ferdinando Carulli.

Works With Opus Numbers　
 Quatre Pièces et Huit Préludes Op. 1, c. 1824
 Trois Petits Duos Op. 1 (Duo de guitares), c. 1809
 Sonate Op. 2, c. 1809
 Trois Airs et Trois Romances Op. 3 (Voix et guitare), c. 1811
 Trois Duos Op. 3 (Violon et guitare), c. 1811
 Trois Airs Op. 4 (Voix et guitare), c. 1808
 Trois Duos Op. 4 (Violon et guitare)
 Recueil de Sonatines Op. 5, c. 1809
 Sonate Op. 5, c. 1810
 Trois Duos Op. 5 (Violon et guitare), c. 1810
 Grand Nocturne Op. 6 (Duo de guitares), c. 1810
 Trois Ouvertures Op. 6, c. 1809
 Sérénade Op. 7 (Duo de guitares), c. 1809
 Trois Sonatine Op. 7, c. 1809
 Concerto Op. 8 in A major (Guitare et Orchestre), c. 1809
 Fantaisie Op. 9, c. 1807
 Grande Sonate Op. 9 (Duo de guitares), c. 1810
 Sonate Op. 9, c. 1809
 Trio Op. 9 (Flûte, violon et guitare), c. 1807
 Grand Solo Op. 10, c. 1809
 Duo Op. 11 (Guitare et Piano), c. 1809
 Trio Op. 12 (Flûte, violon et guitare), c. 1809
 Trois Petits Duos Op. 13 (Violon et guitare), c. 1809
 Duo Op. 14 (Violon et guitare), c. 1810
 Deux Airs variés Op. 15, c. 1811
 Recueil Op. 15 (Duo de guitares), c. 1810
 Grande Sonate Op. 16, c. 1816
 Sonate Sentimentale Op. 16, c. 1816
 Duo Op. 17 (Violon et guitare), c. 1810
 Trois Divertissements Op. 18, c. 1810
 Duo Op. 19 (Violon et guitare), c. 1809
 Solo Op. 20, c. 1810
 Trois Sonate Op. 21, c. 1811
 Trois Duos Op. 22 (Violon et guitare), c. 1811
 Trois Sonatine Op. 23, c. 1811
 Trois Petits Nocturnes Op. 24 (Flûte, alto et guitare), c. 1811
 Grande Sonate Op. 25 (Duo de guitares), c. 1811
 Duo Op. 26 (Violon et guitare), c. 1811
 Duo Concertante Op. 27 (Violon et guitare), c. 1811
 Méthode Op. 27, c. 1809
 Trois Ouvertures Op. 28, c. 1810
 Pot Pourri Op. 29, c. 1811
 Grand Duo Op. 30 (Violon et guitare), c. 1827
 Six Duos Op. 31 (Violon et guitare), c. 1811
 Trois Valse Op. 32 (Guitare et Piano), c. 1810
 Sonate Sentimentale Op. 33, c. 1807
 Six Duos Op. 34 (Duo de guitares), c. 1811
 Recueil Op. 35, c. 1811
 Recueil Op. 36, c. 1811
 Duo Op. 37 (Guitare et Piano), c. 1811
 Deux Thèmes Variés et Rondo Op. 38 (Duo de guitares), c. 1809
 Recueil Op. 38, c. 1812
 Recueil Op. 39, c. 1811
 Recueil Op. 40, c. 1811
 Trois Sonates Op. 41, c. 1811
 Sonate Sentimentale Op. 42, c. 1811
 Trois Duos Op. 43 (Violon et guitare), c. 1811
 Divertissement Op. 44, c. 1811
 Grand Duo Op. 45 (Guitare et Piano), c. 1811
 Trois Grand Duo Op. 46 (Duo de guitares), c. 1811
 Trois Sonate Op. 47, c. 1811
 Trois Duos Op. 48 (Duo de guitares), c. 1810
 Six Contredanses et Trois Valses Op. 49 (Duo de guitares), c. 1809
 Recueil Op. 50, c. 1810
 Six Duos Op. 51 (Flûte ou violon et guitare), c. 1813
 Vingt-quatre Airs Op. 52 (Duo de guitares), c. 1811
 Trois Rondo Op. 53, c. 1813
 Deux Pot Pourris Op. 54, c. 1813
 Deux Thèmes Variés Op. 55, c. 1820
 Trois Sonates Op. 56, c. 1813
 Trois Duos Op. 57 (Duo de guitares), c. 1813
 Six Contredanses Op. 58 (Duo de guitares), c. 1813
 Trois Sonatine Op. 59, c. 1813
 Trois Solo Variés Op. 60, c. 1812
 Méthode Op. 61, c. 1810
 Trois Duos Op. 62 (Duo de guitares), c. 1813
 Grand Duo Op. 63 (Guitare et Piano), c. 1813
 Huit Pièces Op. 64 (Violon et guitare), c. 1813
 Grand Duo Concertant Op. 65 (Guitare et Piano), c. 1810
 Six Airs Op. 66 (Violon et guitare), c. 1811
 Six Duos Op. 67 (Duo de guitares), c. 1813
 Deux Airs variés Op. 68 (Violon et guitare), c. 1813
 Vingt-quatre Airs Op. 69, c. 1813
 Grand Duo Op. 70 (Guitare et Piano), c. 1810
 Méthode Op. 71, c. 1810
 Divertissement Op. 72 (Duo de guitares), c. 1810
 Airs Nationaux Op. 73, c. 1814
 Pot Pourri Op. 74, c. 1813
 Variations Op. 75, c. 1813
 Trois Solo Op. 76, c. 1814
 Deux Pot Pourri Op. 78, c. 1813
 Deux Pot Pourri Op. 79, c. 1814
 Trois Airs Op. 80, c. 1814
 Trois Petites Sonates Op. 81, pub. 1815
 Petites fantasies sur les airs Charmante Gabrielle et Vive Henri IV Op. 82, pub. 1815
 Grande Sonate Op. 83, pub. 1815
 Trois Menuets et Trois Valses Op. 84, c. 1814
 Pièce Historique Op. 85, c. 1814
 Grand Duo Op. 86 (Guitare et Piano), c. 1813
 Six Pièces Op. 87, c. 1815
 Trois Duos Nocturnes Op. 88 (Violon et guitare), c. 1815
 Trois Duos Op. 89 (Duo de guitares), c. 1809
 Trois Duos Nocturnes Op. 90 (Duo de guitares), c. 1809
 Trois Thèmes Variés Op. 91, c. 1812
 Trois Petits Duos Op. 92 (Guitare et Piano), c. 1812
 Recueil Op. 93, c. 1814
 Caprice sur des airs de la Tyrolienne et de la Hongroise Op. 94, pub. 1815 (Naderman, Paris)
 Trois Fantaisie Op. 95, c. 1811
 Trois Sérénades Op. 96 (Duo de guitares), c. 1815
 Recueil Op. 97 (Duo de guitares), c. 1815
 Fantaisie Op. 98, c. 1814
 Recueil Op. 99, c. 1816
 Valse Favorite Op. 100 (Duo de guitares), c. 1820.
 Six Valses Op. 101, c. 1820
 Fantaisie Op. 102 (Violon et guitare), c. 1816
 Trois Trios Concertants Op. 103 (Violon, alto et guitare), c. 1814
 Trois Duos Op. 104 (Duo de guitares), c. 1813
 Six Valses Op. 105, c. 1814
 Ouverture Op. 106 (Duo de guitares), c. 1815
 Solo Op. 107, c. 1816
 Six Valses Viennoises Op. 108 (Violon et guitare), c. 1816
 Six Duos Op. 109 (Flûte et Guitare), c. 1817
 Deux Airs Russes Op. 110 (Duo de guitares), c. 1817
 Pot Pourri Op. 111, c. 1820
 Pot Pourri Op. 112 (Duo de guitares), c. 1817
 Solo Op. 113, c. 1817
 Recueil Op. 114, c. 1817
 Nocturne Op. 115 (Violon et guitare), c. 1817
 Fantaisie Op. 116, c. 1817
 Fantaisie Op. 117 (Duo de guitares), c. 1817
 Nocturne Concertante Op. 118 (Duo de guitares), c. 1817
 Trois Nocturnes Op. 119 (Flûte, violon et guitare), c. 1817
 Recueil Op. 120 (Duo de guitares), c. 1817
 Vingt-quatre Pièces Op. 121, c. 1817
 Vingt-quatre Valse Op. 122, c. 1817
 Fantaisie Op. 123 (Flûte, violon et guitare), c. 1817
 Recueil Op. 124, c. 1818
 Six Airs variés Op. 125, c. 1818
 Danse Nationale Op. 126 (Duo de guitares), c. 1818
 Nocturne Op. 127 (Guitare et Piano), c. 1819
 Six Duos Op. 128 (Duo de guitares), c. 1819
 Six Duos Op. 129 (Violon et guitare), c. 1819
 Vingt-quatre Bagatelles Op.130 c. 1819
 Divertissement Op. 131 (Trois guitares), c. 1825
 Deux Nocturnes Op. 131 (Guitare et Piano), c. 1819
 Divertissement Op. 132 (Duo de guitares), c. 1819
 Duo Op. 133 (Duo de guitares), c. 1819
 Duo Op. 134 (Guitare et Piano), c. 1820
 Duo Op. 135 (Guitare et Piano), c. 1820
 Variations Op. 136 (Duo de guitares), c. 1820
 Deux Duos Op. 137 (Alto et guitare), c. 1820
 Divertissement Op. 138, c. 1820
 Valse Op. 139 (Duo de guitares), c. 1820
 Concerto Op. 140 (Guitare et Orchestre), c. 1820
 Polonaise Op. 141, c. 1824
 Variations Op. 142, c. 1820
 Trois Nocturnes Concertants Op. 143 (Duo de guitares), c. 1820
 Air Varié Op. 144, c. 1820
 Recueil Op. 145, c. 1821
 Trois Duos Op. 146 (Duo de guitares), c. 1821
 Recueil Op. 147, c. 1821
 Trois Duos Op. 147 (Flûte et guitare), c. 1821
 Nocturne Op. 148 (Duo de guitares), c. 1821
 Trois Divertissements Op. 149 (Flûte, violon et guitare), c. 1821
 Duo Op. 150 (Guitare et Piano), c. 1821
 Duo Op. 151 (Guitare et Piano), c. 1821
 Symphonie Op. 152 (Duo de guitares), c. 1822
 Air Op. 153 (Violon et guitare), c. 1822
 Deux Duos Op. 154 (Violon et guitare), c. 1822
 Andante et Rondo Op. 155 (Duo de guitares), c. 1822
 Quintette Op. 156 (Violon et guitare), c. 1822
 Fantaisie Op. 157 (Duo de guitares), c. 1822
 Deux Duos Op. 158 (Flûte et guitare), c. 1822
 Trois Sonatines Op. 159, c. 1822
 Adagio et Variations Op. 160 (Guitare et Piano), c. 1822
 Grande Marche Op. 161 (Guitare et Piano), c. 1822
 Variations et Rondo Op. 162, c. 1822
 Adagio et Finale Op. 163 (Violon et guitare), c. 1822
 Larghetto et Variations Op. 164 (Duo de guitares), c. 1822
 Symphonie Op. 165 (Violon et guitare), c. 1822
 Trois Airs variés Op. 166 (Duo de guitares), c. 1823
 Andante et Rondo Op. 167 (Duo de guitares), c. 1822
 Grande Marche Op. 168 (Guitare et Piano), c. 1822
 Variations Op. 169 (Guitare et Piano), c. 1825
 Trois Petits Duos Op. 170 (Duo de guitares), c. 1827
 Trois Nocturnes Brillants Op. 171 (Flûte, violon et guitare), c. 1827
 Trois Rondo Op. 172, c. 1823
 Recueil Op. 173, c. 1823
 Recueil Op. 174, c. 1823
 Recueil Op. 175, c. 1822
 Recueil Op. 176 (Violon et guitare), c. 1822
 Recueil Op. 177 (Violon et guitare), c. 1822
 Recueil Op. 178 (Violon et guitare), c. 1822
 Recueil Op. 179 (Duo de guitares), c. 1822
 Recueil Op. 180 (Duo de guitares), c. 1822
 Recueil Op. 181 (Duo de guitares), c. 1822
 Recueil Op. 182 (Guitare et Piano), c. 1822
 Recueil Op. 183 (Guitare et Piano), c. 1822
 Recueil Op. 184 (Guitare et Piano), c. 1822
 Nocturne Op. 185, c. 1822
 Caprice Op. 186, c. 1823
 Trois Duos Op. 187 (Duo de guitares), c. 1821
 Divertissement Op. 188, c. 1822
 Trois Duos Nocturnes Op. 189 (Guitare et Piano), c. 1823
 Nocturne Op. 190 (Flûte et guitare), c. 1823
 Trois Duos Op. 191 (Flûte et guitare), c. 1823
 Supplément à la Méthode Op. 192, c. 1822
 Six Contredanses Op. 193 (Violon et guitare), c. 1822
 Six Contredanses Op. 193 (Duo de guitares), c. 1822
 Trois Airs variés Op. 194, c. 1823
 Solfège Op. 195, c. 1822 et c. 1826
 Six Duos Op. 196 (Guitare et Harpe), c. 1823 Op.
 Trois Sonatines Op. 196 (Guitare et Piano), c. 1823
 Fantaisie Op. 197 (Flûte ou violon et guitare), c. 1823
 Trois Duos Op. 198 (Violon et guitare), c. 1823
 Trois Duos Op. 199 (Duo de guitares), c. 1823
 Fantaisie Op. 200 (Duo de guitares), c. 1823
 Fantaisie Op. 201, c. 1823
 Trois Duos Op. 202 (Violon et guitare), c. 1823
 Trois Duos Op. 203 (Duo de guitares), c. 1823
 Douze Petites Pièces Op. 204 c. 1823
 Divertissement Op. 205 (Violon et guitare), c. 1823
 Grand Duo Op. 206 (Violon et guitare), c. 1823
 Deux Solo Op. 207 (Violon, alto, violoncelle et guitare), c. 1823
 Deux Nocturnes Op. 208 (Violon, alto, violoncelle et guitare), c. 1823
 Trois Divertissements Op. 209 c. 1823
 Chanson Op. 210, c. 1823
 Dix-huit Pièces Op. 211 c. 1824
 Six Duos Op. 212 (Duo de guitares), c. 1824
 Divertissement Op. 213 (Duo de guitares), c. 1824
 Divertissement Op. 214 (Violon et guitare), c. 1824
 Recueil Op. 215, c. 1824
 Variations Op. 216, c. 1824
 Fantaisie Op. 217 (Duo de guitares), c. 1824
 Nocturne Op. 218 (Duo de guitares), c. 1828
 Grandes Variations Op. 219 (Duo de guitares), c. 1824
 Variations Op. 219 (Guitare et Orchestre). 1824
 Recueil Op. 221, c. 1825
 Air Varié Op. 222, c. 1824
 Trois Divertissements Op. 223 c. 1826
 Douze Pièces Op. 224 c. 1825
 Six Duos Op. 226 (Duo de guitares), c. 1825
 Trois Nocturne Op. 227 (Duo de guitares), c. 1825
 Fantaisie Op. 228, c. 1824
 Solo Op. 229, c. 1824
 Trois Duos Op. 231 (Duo de guitares), c. 1828
 Recueil Op. 232, c. 1825
 Deux Duos Op. 233 (Guitare et Piano), c. 1824
 Deux Thèmes Variés et Un Rondo Op. 234 c. 1824
 Recueil Op. 235, c. 1825
 Recueil Op. 236 (Guitare et Piano), c. 1825
 Six Rondo Op. 237 (Duo de guitares), c. 1825
 Chanson Op. 238, c. 1825
 Recueil Op. 239 (Violon et guitare), c. 1825
 Trio Op. 240 (Flûte, violon et guitare), c. 1825
 Trio Op. 240 (Flûte, violon et guitare), c. 1825
 Méthode Op. 241, c. 1825
 Trois Rondo Op. 242, c. 1824
 Trois Duos Op. 243 (Duo de guitares), c. 1824
 Deux Duos Op. 244 (Violon et guitare), c. 1824
 Deux Fantaisie Op. 245 (Violon et guitare), c. 1824
 Grand Recueil Op. 246, c. 1825
 Fantaisie Op. 247, c. 1825
 Recueil Op. 248 (Duo de guitares), c. 1825
 Recueil Op. 249 (Violon et guitare), c. 1825
 Trois Solo Op. 250 (Violon et guitare), c. 1825
 Fantaisie Op. 251 (Trois guitares), c. 1825
 Quatuor Op. 252 (Flûte, violon, violoncelle et guitare), c. 1825
 Quatuor Op. 253 (Violon, alto, violoncelle et guitare), c. 1825
 Nocturne Op. 254 (Violon, alto et guitare), c. 1825
 Grand Trio Op. 255 (Trois guitares), c. 1826
 Trois Duos Op. 256 (Violon et guitare), c. 1827
 Deux Divertissements Op. 257 (Violon et guitare), c. 1827
 Trois Divertissements Op. 259 (Violon et guitare), c. 1827
 Trois Solo Op. 260, c. 1827
 Trois Divertissements Op. 261 (Violon et guitare), c. 1826
 Trois Solo Op. 262, c. 1827
 Trois Solo Op. 263, c. 1827
 Pièces Progressives Op. 264, c. 1828
 Petits Préludes Op. 265, c. 1826
 Fantaisie Op. 267, c. 1826
 Trois Trios Concertants Op. 268 (Deux violons et guitare), c. 1827
 Nocturne Op. 269 (Deux violons et guitare), c. 1825
 De tout un peu. Recueil de 34 morceaux divers en six livres, Op.270, c. 1825
 Grande Recueil Op. 272, c. 1825
 Trois Divertissements Op. 273 (Duo de guitares), c. 1825
 Trentedeux Bagatelles Op. 273, c. 1825
 Deux Fantaisie Op. 274, c. 1826
 Grande Recueil Op. 276, c. 1825
 Recueil Op. 277, c. 1825
 Trois Polonaises Op. 278, c. 1825
 Deux Mélodies Op. 281 (Violon et guitare), c. 1825
 Recueil Op. 282, c. 1826
 Trois Divertissements Op. 283 (Flûte ou violon et guitare), c. 1825
 Six Rondo Op. 284, c. 1826
 Trois Duos Brillants Op. 285 (Duo de guitares), c. 1817
 Recueil Op. 286, c. 1830
 Fantaisie Op. 287, c. 1826
 Fantaisie Op. 288 (Flûte, violon et guitare), c. 1826
 Fantaisie Op. 289 (Violon et guitare), c. 1826
 Rondo Op. 290 (Duo de guitares), c. 1827
 Six Pièces Op. 291, c. 1826
 Trois Airs variés Op. 291, c. 1826
 Deux Fantaisie Op. 292, c. 1827
 Méthode pour le Décacorde Op. 293, c. 1826
 Deux Grandes Duos Op. 294 (Duo de guitares), c. 1826
 Quatre Pièces Op. 295 (Violon et guitare), c. 1827
 Rondo, Divertissement et Variations Op. 297 c. 1830
 Fantaisie Op. 298, c. 1827
 Recueil Op. 300, c. 1827
 Variations Op. 301 (Duo de guitares), c. 1829
 Rondo Op. 302 (Duo de guitares), c. 1828
 Fantaisie Op. 303, c. 1828
 Divertissement Op. 304 (Violon et guitare), c. 1828
 Divertissement Op. 305 (Violon et guitare), c. 1834
 Divertissement Op. 306, c. 1827
 Trois Duos Concertants Op. 309 (Violon et guitare), c. 1828
 Vingt-quatre Pièces Op. 310 c. 1828
 Deux Quadrilles Op. 311 (Guitare et Piano), c. 1834
 Duo Op. 312 (Violon et guitare), c. 1828
 Fantaisie Op. 313 (Violon et guitare), c. 1828
 Six Divertissements Op. 317, c. 1829
 Recueil Op. 318 (Duo de guitares), c. 1829
 Recueil Op. 319 (Duo de guitares), c. 1830
 Six Andantes Op. 320, c. 1830
 Dix-huit Pièces Op. 321, c. 1834
 Fantaisie Op. 322, c. 1830
 Fantaisie Op. 323, c. 1830
 Recueil Op. 324, c. 1830
 Fantaisie Op. 325, c. 1830
 Fantaisie Op. 326 (Duo de guitares), c. 1830
 Fantaisie Op. 327, c. 1830
 Grand Duo Concertant Op. 328 (Violon et guitare), c. 1831
 Variations Op. 330, c. 1830
 Les Trois jours Op. 331, c. 1830
 Marche Op. 332, c. 1830
 Recueil Op. 333, c. 1831
 Trois Rondo Op. 334, c. 1831
 Trois Marches Op. 335, c. 1831
 Trois Divertissements Op. 336 (Violon et guitare), c. 1831
 Fantaisie Op. 337 (Flûte et guitare), c. 1831
 Trois Caprices Op. 338 (Flûte ou violon et guitare), c. 1832
 Scherzo Op. 339, c. 1831
 Fantaisie Op. 340, c. 1831
 Deux Fantaisie Op. 341 (Violon et guitare), c. 1832
 Trois Divertissements Op. 342 (Flûte ou violon et guitare), c. 1832
 Trois Nocturnes Op. 343 (Flûte ou violon et guitare), c. 1832
 Recueil Op. 344, c. 1832
 Fantaisie Op. 345 (Violon et guitare), c. 1832
 Fantaisie Op. 346, c. 1832
 Recueil Op. 347, c. 1832
 Deux Rondo Op. 348, c. 1832
 Douze Galops Op. 349, c. 1833
 Six Galops Brillants Op. 350 c. 1834
 Trois Redobles Op. 353 c. 1834
 Fantaisie Op. 363, c. 1835
 Romance Op. 364, c. 1835
 Fantaisie Op. 366, c. 1836

Works Without Opus Numbers　
 Concerto in G major (for Flute, guitar and orchestra), Italian period.
 Symphonie (Flûte, violon et guitare), c. 1825
 Symphonie (Flûte, violon et guitare), c. 1825
 Variety Of Twelve Overtures By Rossini for guitar and piano
 Cinderella, Or Goodness Triumphant
 Bianca And Falliero, Or The Council Of Three
 The Italian Girl In Algiers
 Tancredi
 Othello, Or The Moor Of Venice
 The Merry Deception
 The Barber Of Seville, Or The Useless Precaution
 The Thieving Magpie
 Semiramis
 Torvald And Dorliska
 Edward And Christina
 Armida
 Rondo In D major for guitar and piano
 Fantasy Written With Different Motives From "Fiorella" By Auber In A Major for guitar and piano
 Duo (Voix et guitare)
 Ouverture (Duo de guitares), c. 1820
 Ouverture (Violon et guitare), c. 1812
 Ouverture (Flûte, violon et guitare), c. 1825
 Quatre Nocturnes (Deux voix et guitare)
 Recueil (Flûte et guitare), c. 1815
 Recueil, c. 1824
 Six Nocturnes (Deux voix et guitare)
 Sonate, c. 1807
 Trio (Flûte, violon et guitare), c. 1825

Carulli, Ferdinando